Pieter Mattheus Kruger Le Roux, generally known as P. K. Le Roux (11 November 1904 – 23 June 1985) was a South African National Party politician who served as a Cabinet minister between 1958 and 1968, first as Minister of Water Affairs and Agricultural Technical Services and latterly as Minister of the Interior.

Biography

Pieter Mattheus Kruger Le Roux was born on 11 November 1904 at Doornhoek, a farm near De Rust in the vicinity of Oudtshoorn in what was then the Cape Colony. His parents were Gert Cornelis Le Roux and his wife Margaretha. He attended Outeniqua High School in George, then the University of Stellenbosch.

First elected to parliament in 1948 as the National Party member for Victoria West, Le Roux became the government's Chief Whip in the South African parliament in 1955. He was appointed to the Cabinet as Minister of Water Affairs and Agricultural Technical Services in 1958, shortly before the end of J. G. Strijdom's premiership, and retained this role under Strijdom's successor Hendrik Verwoerd until 1966, when B. J. Vorster became Prime Minister following Verwoerd's assassination. Vorster made Le Roux Minister of the Interior, a post he retained until 1968.

Election results

References

Bibliography

1904 births
Afrikaner people
Government ministers of South Africa
Members of the House of Assembly (South Africa)
National Party (South Africa) politicians
1985 deaths